The Universidad Autónoma de Yucatán (Autonomous University of Yucatan), or UADY, is an autonomous public university in the state of Yucatán, Mexico, with its central campuses located in the state capital of Mérida. It is the largest tertiary educational institution in the state, offering some 41 different courses at the undergraduate or Bachelor's degree (licenciatura) level, and 26 postgraduate Master's degrees (maestrías). The institution was established in 1922 by then governor Felipe Carrillo Puerto as the Universidad Nacional del Sureste, but its lineage may be traced back to a Spanish Empire royal decree promulgated in 1611, that allowed for the creation of the Colegio de San Francisco Javier in Mérida.

See also
 Education in Mexico

Notes

References

External links
 Universidad Autónoma de Yucatán, official website

1922 establishments in Mexico
Universidad Autónoma de Yucatán
Educational institutions established in 1922